Martine Vollan Rønning (born December 17, 1999) is a Norwegian curler from Lillehammer. She currently plays lead on the Norwegian women's curling team skipped by Marianne Rørvik.

Career
Rønning made her international debut at the 2015 European Junior Curling Challenge as the alternate on the Norwegian team skipped by Maia Ramsfjell. After a 5–1 round robin record, the team lost in the quarterfinal round to Italy.

Rønning joined the Norwegian junior women's curling team as the third for the 2015–16 season. The team, skipped by Mari Forbregd, played in the 2016 World Junior B Curling Championships where they finished with a 2–4 record, missing the playoff round. She then rejoined the Maia Ramsfjell rink the following season with second Mille Haslev Nordbye, lead Victoria Johansen and alternate Eirin Mesloe. In her second season with the team, they finished third at the 2018 World Junior B Curling Championships. This qualified them for the 2018 World Junior Curling Championships, where they were able to reach the playoffs with a 5–4 record. The team then lost in the semifinal and bronze medal game, settling for fourth place. They ended the season by winning the 2018 Norwegian Women's Curling Championship. Because of their high placement at the 2018 championship, the team earned direct qualification into the 2019 World Junior Curling Championships. There, they finished in seventh place with a 3–6 record, enough to avoid relegation to the B Championship. They also won their second straight Norwegian women's championship title.

Team Ramsfjell remained as the junior representatives for the 2019–20 season. On tour, the team won their first World Curling Tour event at the WCT Latvian International Challenger. At the 2020 World Junior Curling Championships, the team finished in eighth place, again with a 3–6 record. They ended their season with their third consecutive Norwegian women's title. Also during the 2019–20 season, Rønning was the alternate on the Norwegian women's team skipped by Marianne Rørvik at the 2019 European Curling Championships, her first appearance at the event. There, the team played in the A Division where they finished with a 2–7 record. Despite being listed as the alternate, Rønning played in five games for the team, including their two victories. After the season, Rønning left the junior team to join Rørvik's Norwegian women's team, also including third Mille Haslev Nordbye and second Eli Skaslien.

Team Rørvik began the 2021–22 season representing Norway at the 2021 Pre-Olympic Qualification Event. There, the team went 3–1 in the round robin, however, did not advance to the playoffs due to their draw shot challenge. The team then represented Norway at the 2021 European Curling Championships B Division where they went 7–2 through the round robin. This qualified them for the semifinal where they beat England 10–4 before winning 10–7 over Latvia in the gold medal game, securing promotion into the 2022 A Division. The first place finish also qualified them for the 2022 World Qualification Event for the chance to qualify for the 2022 World Women's Curling Championship. At the event, the Norwegian team went a perfect 6–0 through the round robin to earn the top spot in the playoff round. They then lost to Denmark, before beating Latvia to earn a spot at the Women's Championship. There, the team went 5–7 in the round robin, finishing in eighth place. Also during the 2021–22 season, the team finished second at the 2022 Norwegian Women's Curling Championship to Eirin Mesloe.

Personal life
Rønning is a student.

Teams

References

External links

Norwegian female curlers
Living people
Sportspeople from Lillehammer
1999 births
21st-century Norwegian women